A Corporate Social Entrepreneur (CSE) is someone who attempts to advance a social agenda in addition to a formal job role as part of a corporation. CSEs may or may not operate in organizational contexts that are predisposed toward corporate social responsibility. CSEs' concerns are with both the development of social capital and economic capital, and the formal job role of a CSE may not necessarily be connected with corporate social responsibility, nor does a CSE have to be in an executive or management position.

Relevance

CSE is multi-disciplinary, relating to the fields of corporate social responsibility and sustainability. It is relevant to business and management; specifically to business ethics, sustainability, organizational behavior, entrepreneurship, human resource management and business strategy. The concept overlaps with sociology, anthropology and social psychology and philosophy. See also: corporate social responsibility.

Background
CSE was first described in 2002 from a theoretical working paper which was published in the Hull University Business School Research Memoranda Series. In that paper, it was argued that CSR (and within that, sustainability) can also be motivated by personal values, in addition to the more obvious economic and macro political drivers. This reflected the traditional philosophical and business ethics debate regarding moral agency. This paper was followed by a U.K. conference paper which discussed the importance of managerial discretion in CSR and was published the following year in the Journal of Business Ethics.

The term "corporate social entrepreneur" was coined in a paper presented at the 17th Annual European Business Ethics Network Conference in June 2004. Term corporate social entrepreneur was defined and differentiated from other types of entrepreneurs such as the executive entrepreneurs, intrapreneurs (Pinchot, 1985), the policy entrepreneur, and the public or social entrepreneur. (See also Austin et al., 2006a for a description of the similarities and differences between commercial and social entrepreneurship). Initially, the term related to managers. However it was later widened to includes employees at any level of a firm, regardless of their formally appointed status. Exploratory research shows that being a senior manager is not a pre-requisite for corporate social entrepreneurship, although it is an advantage.

Hemingway’s concept of the CSE emerged as a result of her own personal experience working as a marketing executive in the corporate world and it has also been the subject of some exploratory empirical investigation The notion was also inspired by Wood, who had previously referred to 'Ethical training, cultural background, preferences…and life experiences…that motivate human behavior', thereby supporting Trevino’s conceptual interactionist model of ethical decision making in organizations. Trevino's model included both individual and situational moderators, to combine with the individual’s stage of cognitive moral development, to produce either ethical or unethical behavior. And whilst studies existed regarding the activities of environmental champions at work or other change leaders, none of these studies specifically examined the role of employees' personal values in entrepreneurial discretion with regard to CSR/sustainability.

Thus, the connection between philosophical ideas of moral character as an influence for corporate social responsibility (CSR) and the psychological notions of prosocial or pro-environmental behavior, provides a different focus from the more commonly discussed structural drivers for CSR/sustainability in business and management i.e., business strategy in the form of public relations activity; encouragement from government or organizational context (see also philanthropy).

Difference between the corporate social entrepreneur and the social entrepreneur

The social entrepreneurship literature has largely concentrated on the voluntary, not-for-profit or "third" sector. In the for-profit context, the social entrepreneur is traditionally perceived as a philanthropic agent or business owner. However, the corporate model provides a very different context. In the UK, the corporation is defined by the company’s directors and shareholders in its articles of association, requiring employees to deliver returns to shareholders, through their job roles. The exception to this might be the UK’s Co-operative Group, which describes its business as guided by social mission and is not responsible to shareholders for delivering profit. Consequently, unless a corporate employee has been given special dispensation from the profit motive in order to specifically create social value, their employed work cannot be described as social entrepreneurship (although the individual’s activities outside of the workplace might be). So, even though the majority of corporations, nowadays, claim to be fully committed to CSR, it is pushing the boundaries to describe even the most hybrid of companies (such as those dedicated to the growth of fair trade or environmentally sustainable production), as social enterprises staffed by social entrepreneurs. This is because the remit of the organization as a corporation prevents this. As a consequence, the CSE is unlikely to have the time or other resources to commit full scale toward progressing a socially responsible agenda, due to organizational constraints. Hence corporate social entrepreneurship is characterized by its informality, in terms of being added on to the job and performed in an ad-hoc way, which results in its tremendous variability. Furthermore, the entrepreneurial discretion which is required to perform it is controversial.

Business ethics

Corporate social entrepreneurship exists alongside business ethics but is a distinct concept. Whether or not a business performs an ethical activity is a matter that is separate from a business's entrepreneurial attempts to improve the community. Though both corporate entrepreneurial initiatives and business ethics practices stem from the leadership of a corporate entity, policies may differ. Embezzlement of social entrepreneurial funds is not unheard of, nor are generally unethical business practices being covered up by robust social entrepreneurial programs.

Furthermore, many businesses conduct social entrepreneurship for the sake of public relations, causing many to be skeptical about the link between ethical business practice and the practice of social entrepreneurship. Depending on the industry and country, it may be necessary to appear to be socially responsible and to start new socially oriented programs as a large business in order to survive. Depending on the exact corporate program, what is socially beneficially and ethical at a small scale may not be such at a larger scale. Thus the problem of what is socially responsible in corporate entrepreneurship and what is an ethical business practice is far from solved.

Importantly, social corporate entrepreneurship activity has yet to be quantified on any objective scale, meaning that claims by businesses about their entrepreneurial activities are hard to assess.

There is some evidence which supports the idea that businesses which are ethical as reported by their employees are higher performing than those that do not. This evidence is joined by other evidence which suggests that employees tend to leave companies that they do not view as behaving ethically.

CSE which creates social value and benefits both the corporation and society has been described as a manifestation of enlightened self-interest. Alternatively, a deontological viewpoint frames acts of socially responsible behavior as driven by the individual's sense of duty to society, which may be viewed in terms of altruism.

Research findings

Ethnographic research was conducted in a $1.4bn multi-national corporation between 2005-2008. The tentative findings described four modes of moral commitment to social responsibility and sustainability: the Active CSE, the Concealed CSE, the Conformist and the Disassociated. The 'Disassociated' advocated "more aggressive performance management" for the company and espoused the notion that values were in opposition to corporate performance. The 'Conformist' mode represented the majority of subjects in the study, conforming to the prevailing ethical context, whatever that might be. Many of these individuals were occupying formal CSR/sustainability roles. This mode was characterized by enlightened self-interest: i.e., that CSR/sustainability was good for their careers as well as good for the company. Neither of these two modes contained CSEs. Two modes of corporate social entrepreneurship, 'Active' and 'Concealed', were comparable by their espoused self-transcendent values, and were distinguished by their perception of the organizational context as supportive, or not, of CSR/sustainability. The 'Concealed' CSE was an advocate of some aspects of CSR/sustainability, whilst others were progressed outside of work, because of perceived organizational constraints. By comparison, the 'Active' CSE mode contained individuals with who would speak up when they saw the potential for corporate wrongdoing. This minority of people had a reputation within the company as responsible personal leaders of integrity.

Activity done by CSEs varied in magnitude across the domains of CSR. Some had initiated company-wide and formally approved environmental projects. Others had advocated animal welfare, or spoke out to protect vulnerable colleagues. CSEs were found in different company positions, and a characteristic of CSEs was that they had actively enlarged their own job roles to encompass their areas of social concern.

Research  by Summers and Dyck (2011) described the abstract stages of CSE as: first socialization, or the conception of a socially beneficial idea. Second externalization, developing the idea into a concrete plan. Third integration, making the idea a reality using any available resources. Finally, fourth is internalization, or establishing the socially beneficial practice into the company.

Threat or opportunity?

All this leads us to the inherent complexity surrounding the subject of CSR, regarding its connection to stakeholder theory and its essentially contested nature. So, whilst some studies have shown a positive relationship between CSR and financial performance, others regard the picture as more nuanced. Consequently, the notion of the Corporate Social Entrepreneur is equally controversial: not solely due to the arguments about the role of business and whether or not CSR helps financial performance; but also because the concept of employee discretion has been identified as a key factor regarding a social orientation at work, or, a moral character (in the ancient philosophical sense). And whilst the possibility of unethical behavior is also acknowledged as an outcome of discretion and agency: corporate irresponsibility which has been a focus of study in business ethics, is regarded as insufficient and only the starting point, if our quest is to develop more socially responsible organizational contexts. This is of particular relevance in the wake of the global financial crisis from 2008, caused by financial irregularities and lapses in corporate governance and personal integrity. Further, these failures of neo-liberal capitalism have produced calls to move beyond capitalism. This has been illustrated theoretically by Hemingway (see Chapter 12, 2013), who posited the structural conditioning of big business, from the now old-fashioned Friedmanite position on CSR to the current, dominant, instrumental CSR perspective, which was exemplified by her 'Conformist' informants. Then, transforming beyond enlightened self-interest to a new form of capitalism, via corporate social entrepreneurship.

The synonymous nature of corporate social entrepreneurship and social intrapreneurship

Corporate social entrepreneurship often becomes necessary when there is a difficult balance between the financial objectives of a company and public well-being. These individuals are closely related to and sometimes referred to as Social Intraprenuers. Indeed, Hemingway (2013) referred to the synonymous nature of the two terms: intrapreneur (Pinchot, 1985) and corporate entrepreneur.

Social entrepreneurship was described by two landmark reports on the subject. Net Impact, with the support of eBay, wrote the report Making Your Impact at Work, and SustainAbility, with the support of IDEO, Skoll Foundation, and Allianz, compiled the report The Social Intrapreneur: A Field Guide for Corporate Changemakers. BeDo held the first conference on the subject, BeDo Intra 2009, around the Social Capital Markets Conference (SOCAP09) in San Francisco. Wherein some social intreprenuers met to discuss their common motivation and challenges in enacting social change. In the fall of 2012, Ashoka Changemakers, in partnership with Accenture, initiated the first network exclusively for social intrapreneurs, the League of Intrapreneurs. This has since been added to by new networks aiming to actively create new profitably do good ideas and help intrapreneurs to deliver them such as The Circle of Young Intrapreneurs.

Despite the widespread appointment of ethics and compliance officers in the United States., many organizations in the United States have experienced difficulty in adding aspects of corporate social entrepreneurship/responsibility into their practices, due to the fact that these methods must be created within the organization. Corporate social entrepreneurship requires those at the top of an organization to take charge and put the company in a position to have a positive social impact, such as offering rewards for employees that act in a socially responsible manner. The value system that is employed within an organization plays a large role for the emergence of corporate social entrepreneurs. Moreover, the sustainability of social intrapreneurship ventures have been called into question by critics, and the process is generally long and strenuous. Socially beneficial ventures have had difficulties turning profit, as they often look at the long term benefits while struggling in the short term, leading to hesitance from investors. Nevertheless, Hemingway's (2013) study showed enormous variation in the types of activities corporate social entrepreneurs were engaged in, across all the domains of CSR. This activity also ranged in scale: from formally sanctioned projects, to informal activity taking place under the organizational 'radar'.

Encouraging corporate social entrepreneurship/social intrapreneurship

If a company decides to adopt corporate social entrepreneurship, there are a few researched circumstances that have been shown to increase socially intrapreneurial activity. When there is a change in the environment that disconnects sanctions and rewards,  a disassociation of the company norms from their assumed moral foundations, resulting in an undermined set of core beliefs. When employees are dissatisfied with the existing moral assumptions of the company, they are more likely to take personal initiative. If the employee feels they will be supported and given access to resources without immediate guaranteed results, these employees are more likely to pursue social intrapreneurship past the idea stage.

See also
Business ethics
Corporate governance
Corporate social responsibility
Entrepreneurship
Intrapreneurship
Moral agency
Moral development
Morality
Philanthropy
Social entrepreneurship

References

Bibliography
 Archer, M.S., Being Human: The Problem of Agency, Cambridge University Press, Cambridge. 2000.
 
 Austin, J.; Leonard, H.; Reficco, E. and Wei-Skillern, J. Social Entrepreneurship: It is for Corporations too in Social Entrepreneurship: New Models of Sustainable Social Change A. Nicholls, ed., Oxford University Press, Oxford. 2006b, pp. 169 – 181.
 Austin, J.; Leonard, H; Reficco, E. and Wei-Skillern, J. Corporate Social Entrepreneurship: A New Vision for CSR in The Accountable Corporation: Corporate Social Responsibility Volume 3 M. Epstein and K. Hanson, eds., Praeger, Westport, CT. 2006c, pp. 237 – 247.
 Bierhoff, H.-W., Prosocial Behaviour, Psychology Press, Hove. 2002.
 
 Drumwright, M.E., Socially Responsible Organisational Buying: Environmental Concern as a Noneconomic Buying Criterion. Journal of Marketing 58[July], 1–19. 1994.
 Fisher, C. and Lovell, A., Business Ethics and Values, 2nd ed., Pearson Education, Harlow, U.K. 2006.
 Friedman, M., The Social Responsibility of Business is to Increase Its Profits. The New York Times Magazine, 13 September, 1–13. 1970.
 Hemingway, C.A., An Exploratory Analysis of Corporate Social Responsibility: Definitions, Motives and Values, Research Memorandum No. 34, University of Hull Business School. 2002. 
 Hemingway, C.A., Personal Values as the Catalyst for the Corporate Social Entrepreneur. 17th Annual European Business Ethics Network (EBEN) Conference (‘Ethics and Entrepreneurship’), University of Twente, Enschede, The Netherlands, 24/26 June 2004.
 
 Hemingway, C.A., What Determines Corporate Social Entrepreneurship? Antecedents and Consequences, Conditions and Character Traits. Presented at the PhD Workshop, ‘CSR and Sustainable Business’, School of Management and Entrepreneurship, Katholieke Universitat Leuven, Belgium, 5 May 2006.
 
 
 Hemingway, C.A. and Maclagan, P.W. (2003), Managers' Individual Discretion and Corporate Social Responsibility: the Relevance of Personal Values. 7th European Business Ethics Network (EBEN- UK) U.K. Annual Conference, and the 5th Ethics and Human Resource Management Conference, Selwyn College, Cambridge, 7–8 April 2003. .
 Hemingway, C.A. and Maclagan, P.W., Managers Personal Values as Drivers of Corporate Social Responsibility, Journal of Business Ethics, 50(1), March (I), pp. 33–44. 2004.
 Jones, T.M., Instrumental Stakeholder Theory: a Synthesis of Ethics and Economics. Academy of Management Review 20[2], 404–437. 1995.
 Kohlberg, L., in Handbook of Socialization Theory and Research D.A. Goslin, ed., Rand McNally, Chicago. 1969, pp. 347–480.
 Lovell, A., Moral Agency as Victim of the Vulnerability of Autonomy. Business Ethics: A European Review 11[1], 62–76. January 2002.
 
 McWilliams A. and Siegel, D., Corporate Social Responsibility: A Theory of the Firm Perspective. Academy of Management Review 26[1], 117–127. 2001.
 Monbiot, G., Captive State: The Corporate Takeover of Britain, Macmillan, London. 2000.
 Moon, J., in The International Directory of Corporate Philanthropy C. Hartley, ed., Europa, London. 2003.
 Pinchot, G. Intrapreneuring: Why You Don’t Have To leave The Corporation To Become an Entrepreneur. New York: Harper and Row. 1985.
 Schwartz, S.H. and Bilsky, W., Toward a Universal Psychological Structure of Human Values. Journal of Personality and Social Psychology 53 [3], 550–562. 1987.
 Schwartz, S. H. and Boehnke, K., Evaluating the Structure of Human Values with Confirmatory Factor Analysis. Journal of Research in Personality 38, 230–255. 2004.
 Soros, G., The Crisis and What to Do About It. The New York Review of Books 55[19], 4 December 2008. Accessed online The Crisis & What to Do About It | George Soros April 2009.
 Trevino, L. K., Ethical Decision Making in Organizations: a Person-Situation Interactionist Model. Academy of Management Review 11[3], 601–617. 1986.
 Wood, D. L., Corporate Social Performance Revisited. Academy of Management Review 16[4], 691–718. 1991.

Social entrepreneurship
Corporate social responsibility